Tyler James Williams (born November 17, 1994 in Chandler, Arizona) is an American cyclist, who currently rides for UCI Continental team .

Major results
2014
 2nd Paris–Roubaix Espoirs
2016
 1st Stage 1 (TTT) Olympia's Tour
 3rd Road race, National Under-23 Road Championships
2021
 1st  Overall Joe Martin Stage Race
Stage 1

References

External links

1994 births
Living people
American male cyclists
Sportspeople from Bakersfield, California